Kang Chun-hyok (강춘혁) is a North Korean defector, artist, and rapper. Kang defected during the late 1990s and early 2000s.

Life in North Korea 

Kang was born in Onseong. Kang's father left North Korea for China in 1997 but was caught and imprisoned. Kang was a kotjebi (homeless child). When he was 9 or 10 years old he witnessed a public execution. He ran away from home at age 13. Once Kang's father was released from prison, the family crossed the Tumen river to China in 1998. In 2001, the family were caught by the Chinese police. Kang bribed the Chinese officials, and travelled to South Korea via Vietnam and Cambodia. His family reunited with him in South Korea later that year.

Life in South Korea 

He has studied fine arts at Hongik University. 
In 2014, Kang appeared on series three of Show Me The Money. Following his appearance on the show, Yang Dong-geun has been producing an album with Kang. Kang's raps are about his experiences in North Korea. His art was showcased in the exhibition 꽃제비 날다 전시회 (Kkotjebi in Bloom: North Korean Children’s Flight to Freedom) focusing on the experiences of kotjebi alongside pieces by Sun Mu. In 2016, he appeared on the TV show Abnormal Summit talking about his experiences defecting.

Discography
Kang has released the songs 못 다한 이야기 (Feat 3mm) and For The Freedom (feat. 3mm, CarpeDiem) on YouTube in 2015 and 2016, respectively. In 2021 he released a song called Vendetta (Feat. 3mm).

Filmography

Television series

Notes

References

External links 
 

North Korean defectors
Living people
South Korean male rappers
1986 births